Weißlahnsee or Badesee Weißlahn is a lake of Terfens, Tyrol, Austria. It is an artificial bathing lake fed and drained by a small stream which is a minor tributary of the River Inn.

References

Lakes of Tyrol (state)